The Lucky Ones is the only full-length album from the Canadian rock band Pride Tiger. The music is 1970s-style rock with strong melodies and dual guitar harmonies.

It was nominated for a 2008 Juno Award in the Rock Album of the Year category.

Track listing

References

External links
 pridetiger.com

2007 albums
Pride Tiger albums
Albums produced by Matt Hyde